Ernesto Grobet (29 June 1909 – 29 September 1969) was a Mexican cyclist. He competed in the time trial event at the 1932 Summer Olympics.

References

External links
 

1909 births
1969 deaths
Mexican male cyclists
Olympic cyclists of Mexico
Cyclists at the 1932 Summer Olympics
Sportspeople from Veracruz
20th-century Mexican people